Jürgen Bachmann (born 20 January 1942) is a retired German swimmer who won a bronze medal in the 400 medley event at the 1962 European Aquatics Championships. He also competed in the 200 m butterfly at the 1960 Summer Olympics but was eliminated in preliminaries.

References

1942 births
East German male swimmers
Swimmers at the 1960 Summer Olympics
Olympic swimmers of the United Team of Germany
Living people
European Aquatics Championships medalists in swimming
German male butterfly swimmers